Djalma Pereira Dias Júnior (21 August 1939 – 1 May 1990) was a Brazilian footballer who played as a defender.

Football career
During his career, Djalma Dias played for América Football Club -  where he won the Rio state championship of 1960 -, Sociedade Esportiva Palmeiras, Clube Atlético Mineiro, Santos Futebol Clube and Botafogo de Futebol e Regatas, retiring in 1974 at the age of 35.

He played 21 times for the Brazilian national team, but did not attend any major international tournament. He died of cardiorespiratory arrest at the age of 50.

Personal
He was born in Rio de Janeiro and lived there all his life. One of Djalma Dias' sons, Djalminha, was also a footballer, a talented attacking midfielder who played for Deportivo de La Coruña, retiring in 2004.

References

External links

1939 births
1990 deaths
Footballers from Rio de Janeiro (city)
Brazilian footballers
Association football defenders
America Football Club (RJ) players
Sociedade Esportiva Palmeiras players
Clube Atlético Mineiro players
Santos FC players
Botafogo de Futebol e Regatas players
Brazil international footballers